Mawkmai is a town and capital of Mawkmai Township in Loilem District, Shan State, Burma. Mawkmai is connected by road to Loimut in the west and Langkho in the north-east which connects with the National Road 45.
It was the historical capital of former Mawkmai State.

References

Township capitals of Myanmar
Mawkmai Township